Vancomycin is a glycopeptide antibiotic medication used to treat a number of bacterial infections. It is recommended intravenously as a treatment for complicated skin infections, bloodstream infections, endocarditis, bone and joint infections, and meningitis caused by methicillin-resistant Staphylococcus aureus. Blood levels may be measured to determine the correct dose. Vancomycin is also taken by mouth as a treatment for severe Clostridium difficile colitis. When taken by mouth it is poorly absorbed.

Common side effects include pain in the area of injection and allergic reactions. Occasionally, hearing loss, low blood pressure, or bone marrow suppression occur. Safety in pregnancy is not clear, but no evidence of harm has been found, and it is likely safe for use when breastfeeding. It is a type of glycopeptide antibiotic and works by blocking the construction of a cell wall.

Vancomycin was approved for medical use in the United States in 1958. It is on the World Health Organization's List of Essential Medicines. The World Health Organization classifies vancomycin as critically important for human medicine. It is available as a generic medication. Vancomycin is made by the soil bacterium Amycolatopsis orientalis.

Medical uses
Vancomycin is indicated for the treatment of serious, life-threatening infections by Gram-positive bacteria unresponsive to other antibiotics.

The increasing emergence of vancomycin-resistant enterococci has resulted in the development of guidelines for use by the Centers for Disease Control Hospital Infection Control Practices Advisory Committee. These guidelines restrict use of vancomycin to these indications:
 Treatment of serious infections caused by susceptible organisms resistant to penicillins (methicillin-resistant S. aureus (MRSA) and multidrug-resistant S. epidermidis (MRSE)) or in individuals with serious allergy to penicillins
 Treatment of pseudomembranous colitis caused by C. difficile; in particular, in cases of relapse or where the infection is unresponsive to metronidazole treatment (for this indication, vancomycin is given orally, rather than by its typical intravenous route)
 For treatment of infections caused by Gram-positive microorganisms in patients with serious allergies to beta-lactam antimicrobials.
 Antibacterial prophylaxis for endocarditis following certain procedures in penicillin-hypersensitive individuals at high risk
 Surgical prophylaxis for major procedures involving implantation of prostheses in institutions with a high rate of MRSA or MRSE
 Early in treatment as an empiric antibiotic for possible MRSA infection while waiting for culture identification of the infecting organism
 Halting the progression of primary sclerosing cholangitis and preventing symptoms; vancomycin does not cure the patient and success is limited
 Treatment of endophthalmitis by intravitreal injection for gram-positive bacteria coverage. It use to prevent the condition, however, is not recommended due to the risk of side effects.

Spectrum of susceptibility 
Vancomycin is considered a last resort medication for the treatment of sepsis and lower respiratory tract, skin, and bone infections caused by Gram-positive bacteria. The minimum inhibitory concentration susceptibility data for a few medically significant bacteria are:
 S. aureus: 0.25 μg/mL to 4.0 μg/mL
 S. aureus (methicillin resistant or MRSA): 1 μg/mL to 138 μg/mL
 S. epidermidis: ≤0.12 μg/mL to 6.25 μg/mL

Side effects
Serum vancomycin levels may be monitored in an effort to reduce side effects, although the value of such monitoring has been questioned. Peak and trough levels are usually monitored, and for research purposes, the area under the concentration curve is also sometimes used. Toxicity is best monitored by looking at trough values.

Common adverse drug reactions (≥1% of patients) associated with IV vancomycin include: local pain, which may be severe, and thrombophlebitis.

Damage to the kidneys (nephrotoxicity) and to the hearing (ototoxicity) were side effects of the early impure versions of vancomycin, and these were prominent in the clinical trials conducted in the mid-1950s. Later trials using purer forms of vancomycin found nephrotoxicity is an infrequent adverse effect (0.1% to 1% of patients), but this is accentuated in the presence of aminoglycosides.

Rare adverse effects (<0.1% of patients) include: anaphylaxis, toxic epidermal necrolysis, erythema multiforme, red man syndrome, superinfection, thrombocytopenia, neutropenia, leukopenia, tinnitus, dizziness and/or ototoxicity, and DRESS syndrome.

Vancomycin can induce platelet-reactive antibodies in the patient, leading to severe thrombocytopenia and bleeding with florid petechial hemorrhages, ecchymoses, and wet purpura.

Historically, vancomycin has been considered a nephrotoxic and ototoxic drug, based on numerous case reports in the medical literature following initial approval by the FDA in 1958. However, as the use of vancomycin increased with the spread of MRSA beginning in the 1970s, toxicity risks were reassessed. With the removal of impurities present in earlier formulations of the drug, and with the introduction of therapeutic drug monitoring, the risk for severe toxicity has been reduced.

Nephrotoxicity
The extent of nephrotoxicity for vancomycin remains controversial. In 1980s, vancomycin with a purity > 90% was available, and kidney toxicity defined by an increase in serum creatinine of at least 0.5 mg/dl, occurred in only about 5% of patients. However, dosing guidelines from the 1980s until 2008 recommended vancomycin trough concentrations between 5 and 15 μg/ml. Concern for treatment failures prompted recommendations for higher dosing (troughs 15 to 20 μg/ml) for serious infection, and acute kidney injury (AKI) rates attributable to the vancomycin increased.

Importantly, the risk of AKI increases with co-administration of other known nephrotoxins, in particular, aminoglycosides. Furthmore, the sort of infections treated with vancomycin may also cause AKI and sepsis is the most common cause of AKI in critically ill patients. Finally, studies in humans are mainly associations studies where the cause of AKI is usually multifacotorial.

Animal studies have demonstrated that higher doses and longer duration of vancomycin exposure correlates with increased histopathologic damage and elevations in urinary biomarkers of AKI.37-38 Damage is most prevalent at the proximal tubule, which is further supported by urinary biomarkers, such as kidney injury molecule-1 (KIM-1), clusterin, and osteopontin (OPN),
and in humans, insulin-like growth factor binding protein 7 (IGFBP7) as part of the nephrocheck test.

The mechanisms that underlie the pathogenesis of vancomycin nephrotoxicity are multifactorial but include interstitial nephritis, tubular injury due to oxidative stress, and cast formation.

Ototoxicity
Attempts to establish rates of vancomycin-induced ototoxicity are even more difficult due to the scarcity of quality evidence. The current consensus is that clearly related cases of vancomycin ototoxicity are rare. The association between vancomycin serum levels and ototoxicity is also uncertain. While cases of ototoxicity have been reported in patients whose vancomycin serum level exceeded 80 µg/mL, cases have been reported in patients with therapeutic levels, as well. Thus, whether therapeutic drug monitoring of vancomycin for the purpose of maintaining "therapeutic" levels will prevent ototoxicity also remains unproven.

Interactions with other nephrotoxins
Another area of controversy and uncertainty concerns the question of whether, and if so, to what extent, vancomycin increases the toxicity of other nephrotoxins. Clinical studies have yielded variable results, but animal models indicate some increased nephrotoxic effect probably occurs when vancomycin is added to nephrotoxins such as aminoglycosides. However, a dose- or serum level-effect relationship has not been established.

Dosing considerations

The recommended parenteral dosage in adults is 500 mg iv every 6 hours or 1000 mg every 12 hours, with modification to achieve a therapeutic range as needed. The recommended oral dosage in the treatment of antibiotic induced pseudomembranous enterocolitis is 125 to 500 mg every 6 hours for 7 to 10 days.

Intravenous vs oral administration
Vancomycin must be given intravenously (IV) for systemic therapy, since it is not absorbed from the intestine. It is a large hydrophilic molecule that partitions poorly across the gastrointestinal mucosa. Due to short half-life, it is often injected twice daily.

The only approved indication for oral vancomycin therapy is in the treatment of pseudomembranous colitis, where it must be given orally to reach the site of infection in the colon. Following oral administration, the fecal concentration of vancomycin is around 500 µg/mL (sensitive strains of C. difficile have a mean inhibitory concentration of ≤2 µg/mL)

Inhaled vancomycin has also been used (off-label), via nebulizer, for treatment of various infections of the upper and lower respiratory tract.

There is an ongoing debate as to whether vancomycin should be given through a central or peripheral line. According to a 2014 review, midline catheters are a safe option for administration.

Vancomycin Flushing Reaction (aka "Red man syndrome")

Vancomycin is recommended to be administered in a dilute solution slowly, over at least 60 min (maximum rate of 10 mg/min for doses >500 mg) due to the high incidence of pain and thrombophlebitis and to avoid an infusion reaction known as vancomycin flushing reaction. This phenomenon has been often clinically referred to as "red man syndrome". The reaction usually appears within 4 to 10 min after the commencement or soon after the completion of an infusion and is characterized by flushing and/or an erythematous rash that affects the face, neck, and upper torso, attributed due to release of histamine from the mast cells. These findings are due to interaction of vancomycin with MRGPRX2, a GPCR mediating IgE-independent mast cell degranulation. Less frequently, hypotension and angioedema may also occur. Symptoms may be treated or prevented with antihistamines, including diphenhydramine, and are less likely to occur with slow infusion.

Therapeutic drug monitoring
Plasma level monitoring of vancomycin is necessary due to the drug's biexponential distribution, intermediate hydrophilicity, and potential for ototoxicity and nephrotoxicity, especially in populations with poor renal function and/or increased propensity to bacterial infection. Vancomycin activity is considered to be time-dependent; that is, antimicrobial activity depends on the duration that the serum drug concentration exceeds the minimum inhibitory concentration  of the target organism. Thus, peak serum levels have not been shown to correlate with efficacy or toxicity; indeed, concentration monitoring is unnecessary in most cases. Circumstances in which therapeutic drug monitoring  is warranted include: patients receiving concomitant aminoglycoside therapy, patients with (potentially) altered pharmacokinetic parameters, patients on haemodialysis, patients administered high-dose or prolonged treatment, and patients with impaired renal function. In such cases, trough concentrations are measured.

Target ranges for serum vancomycin concentrations have changed over the years. Early authors suggested peak levels of 30 to 40 mg/L and trough levels of 5 to 10 mg/L,
but current recommendations are that peak levels need not be measured and that trough levels of 10 to 15 mg/L or 15 to 20 mg/L, depending on the nature of the infection and the specific needs of the patient, may be appropriate. Using measured vancomycin concentrations to calculate doses optimizes therapy in patients with augmented renal clearance.

Biosynthesis

Vancomycin is made by the soil bacterium Amycolatopsis orientalis.

Vancomycin biosynthesis occurs primarily via three nonribosomal protein syntheses (NRPSs) VpsA, VpsB, and VpsC. The enzymes determine the amino acid sequence during its assembly through its 7 modules. Before vancomycin is assembled through NRPS, the non-proteinogenic amino acids are first synthesized. L-tyrosine is modified to become the β-hydroxytyrosine (β-HT) and 4-hydroxyphenylglycine (4-Hpg) residues. 3,5 dihydroxyphenylglycine ring (3,5-DPG) is derived from acetate.

Nonribosomal peptide synthesis occurs through distinct modules that can load and extend the protein by one amino acid per module through the amide bond formation at the contact sites of the activating domains. Each module typically consists of an adenylation (A) domain, a peptidyl carrier protein (PCP) domain, and a condensation (C) domain. In the A domain, the specific amino acid is activated by converting into an aminoacyl adenylate enzyme complex attached to a 4'phosphopantetheine cofactor by thioesterification The complex is then transferred to the PCP domain with the expulsion of AMP. The PCP domain uses the attached 4'-phosphopantethein prosthetic group to load the growing peptide chain and their precursors. The organization of the modules necessary to biosynthesize Vancomycin is shown in Figure 1. In the biosynthesis of Vancomycin, additional modification domains are present, such as the epimerization (E) domain, which isomerizes the amino acid from one stereochemistry to another, and a thioesterase domain (TE) is used as a catalyst for cyclization and releases of the molecule via a thioesterase scission.

A set of NRPS enzymes (peptide synthase VpsA, VpsB, and VpsC) are responsible for assembling the heptapeptide. (Figure 2). VpsA codes for modules 1, 2, and 3. VpsB codes for modules 4, 5, and 6, and VpsC codes for module 7. The vancomycin aglycone contains 4 D-amino acids, although the NRPSs only contain 3 epimerization domains. The origin of D-Leu at residue 1 is not known. The three peptide syntheses are located at the start of the region of the bacterial genome linked with antibiotic biosynthesis, and span 27 kb.

β-hydroxytyrosine (β-HT) is synthesized prior to incorporation into the heptapeptide backbone. L-tyrosine is activated and loaded on the NRPS VpsD, hydroxylated by OxyD, and released by the thioesterase Vhp. The timing of the chlorination by halogenase VhaA during biosynthesis is currently undetermined, but is proposed to occur before the complete assembly of the heptapeptide.

After the linear heptapeptide molecule is synthesized, vancomycin has to undergo further modifications, such as oxidative cross-linking and glycosylation, in trans by distinct enzymes, referred to as tailoring enzymes, to become biologically active (Figure 3). To convert the linear heptapeptide to cross-linked, glycosylated vancomycin, six enzymes, are required. The enzymes OxyA, OxyB, OxyC, and OxyD are cytochrome P450 enzymes. OxyB catalyzes oxidative cross-linking between residues 4 and 6, OxyA between residues 2 and 4, and OxyC between residues 5 and 7. This cross-linking occurs while the heptapeptide is covalently bound to the PCP domain of the 7th NRPS module. These P450s are recruited by the X domain present in the 7th NRPS module, which is unique to glycopeptide antibiotic biosynthesis. The cross-linked heptapeptide is then released by the action of the TE domain, and methyltransferase Vmt then N-methylates the terminal leucine residue. GtfE then joins D-glucose to the phenolic oxygen of residue 4, followed by the addition of vancosamine catalyzed by GtfD.

Some of the glycosyltransferases capable of glycosylating vancomycin and related nonribosomal peptides display notable permissivity and have been employed for generating libraries of differentially glycosylated analogs through a process known as glycorandomization.

Total synthesis
Both the vancomycin aglycone and the complete vancomycin molecule have been targets successfully reached by total synthesis. The target was first achieved by David Evans in October 1998, KC Nicolaou in December 1998, Dale Boger in 1999, and has recently been more selectively synthesized again by Dale Boger in 2020.

Pharmacology and chemistry
Vancomycin is a branched tricyclic glycosylated nonribosomal peptide produced by the Actinomycetota species Amycolatopsis orientalis (formerly designated Nocardia orientalis).

Vancomycin exhibits atropisomerism—it has multiple chemically distinct rotamers owing to the rotational restriction of some of the bonds. The form present in the drug is the thermodynamically more stable conformer.

Mechanism of action 

Vancomycin acts by inhibiting proper cell wall synthesis in Gram-positive bacteria. Due to the different mechanism by which Gram-negative bacteria produce their cell walls and the various factors related to entering the outer membrane of Gram-negative organisms, vancomycin is not active against them (except some nongonococcal species of Neisseria).

The large hydrophilic molecule is able to form hydrogen bond interactions with the terminal D-alanyl-D-alanine moieties of the NAM/NAG-peptides. Under normal circumstances, this is a five-point interaction. This binding of vancomycin to the D-Ala-D-Ala prevents cell wall synthesis of the long polymers of N-acetylmuramic acid (NAM) and N-acetylglucosamine (NAG) that form the backbone strands of the bacterial cell wall, and it prevents the backbone polymers that do manage to form from cross-linking with each other.

Plant tissue culture
Vancomycin is one of the few antibiotics used in plant tissue culture to eliminate Gram-positive bacterial infection. It has relatively low toxicity to plants.

Antibiotic resistance

Intrinsic resistance
A few Gram-positive bacteria are intrinsically resistant to vancomycin: Leuconostoc and Pediococcus species, but these organisms rarely cause diseases in humans. Most Lactobacillus species are also intrinsically resistant to vancomycin, with the exception of L. acidophilus and L. delbrueckii, which are sensitive. Other Gram-positive bacteria with intrinsic resistance to vancomycin include Erysipelothrix rhusiopathiae, Weissella confusa, and Clostridium innocuum.

Most Gram-negative bacteria are intrinsically resistant to vancomycin because their outer membranes are impermeable to large glycopeptide molecules (with the exception of some non-gonococcal Neisseria species).

Acquired resistance
Evolution of microbial resistance to vancomycin is a growing problem, in particular, within healthcare facilities such as hospitals. While newer alternatives to vancomycin exist, such as linezolid (2000) and daptomycin (2003), the widespread use of vancomycin makes resistance to the drug a significant worry, especially for individual patients if resistant infections are not quickly identified and the patient continues the ineffective treatment. Vancomycin-resistant Enterococcus  emerged in 1986. Vancomycin resistance evolved in more common pathogenic organisms during the 1990s and 2000s, including vancomycin-intermediate S. aureus (VISA) and vancomycin-resistant S. aureus (VRSA). Agricultural use of avoparcin, another similar glycopeptide antibiotic, may have contributed to the evolution of vancomycin-resistant organisms.

One mechanism of resistance to vancomycin involves the alteration to the terminal amino acid residues of the NAM/NAG-peptide subunits, under normal conditions, D-alanyl-D-alanine, to which vancomycin binds. The D-alanyl-D-lactate variation results in the loss of one hydrogen-bonding interaction (4, as opposed to 5 for D-alanyl-D-alanine) possible between vancomycin and the peptide. This loss of just one point of interaction results in a 1000-fold decrease in affinity. The D-alanyl-D-serine variation causes a six-fold loss of affinity between vancomycin and the peptide, likely due to steric hindrance.

In enterococci, this modification appears to be due to the expression of an enzyme that alters the terminal residue. Three main resistance variants have been characterised to date among resistant Enterococcus faecium and E. faecalis populations:
 VanA - enterococcal resistance to vancomycin and teicoplanin; inducible on exposure to these agents
 VanB - lower-level enterococcal resistance; inducible by vancomycin, but strains may remain susceptible to teicoplanin
 VanC - least clinically important; enterococci resistant only to vancomycin; constitutive resistance

Variant of vancomycin has been tested that binds to the resistant D-lactic acid variation in vancomycin-resistant bacterial cell walls, and also binds well to the original target (vancomycin-susceptible bacteria).

"Re-gained" vancomycin 
In 2020 a team at the University Hospital Heidelberg (Germany) re-gained the antibacterial power of vancomycin by modifying the molecule with a cationic oligopeptide. The oligopeptide consists of six arginin units in Position VN. In comparison to the unmodified vancomycin the activity against vancomycin-resistant bacteria could be enhanced by a factor of 1,000. This pharmacon is still in preclinical development. Therefore, a potential approval will take several more years.

History 
Vancomycin was first isolated in 1953 by Edmund Kornfeld (working at Eli Lilly) from a bacteria in a soil sample collected from the interior jungles of Borneo by a missionary, Rev. William M. Bouw (1918–2006). The organism that produced it was eventually named Amycolatopsis orientalis. The original indication for vancomycin was for the treatment of penicillin-resistant Staphylococcus aureus.

The compound was initially called compound 05865, but was eventually given the generic name vancomycin, derived from the term "vanquish". One advantage that was quickly apparent was that staphylococci did not develop significant resistance, despite serial passage in culture media containing vancomycin. The rapid development of penicillin resistance by staphylococci led to its being fast-tracked for approval by the Food and Drug Administration. In 1958, Eli Lilly first marketed vancomycin hydrochloride under the trade name Vancocin.

Vancomycin never became the first-line treatment for S. aureus for several reasons:
 It possesses poor oral bioavailability, so must be given intravenously for most infections.
 β-Lactamase-resistant semisynthetic penicillins such as methicillin (and its successors, nafcillin and cloxacillin) were subsequently developed, which have better activity against non-MRSA staphylococci.
 Early trials used early, impure forms of the drug ("Mississippi mud"), which were found to be toxic to the inner ear and to the kidneys; these findings led to vancomycin's being relegated to the position of a drug of last resort.

In 2004, Eli Lilly licensed Vancocin to ViroPharma in the U.S., Flynn Pharma in the UK, and Aspen Pharmacare in Australia. The patent had expired in the early 1980s, and the FDA authorized the sale of several generic versions in the US, including from manufacturers Bioniche Pharma, Baxter Healthcare, Sandoz, Akorn-Strides, and Hospira.

References

External links 
 
 

Eli Lilly and Company brands
Glycopeptide antibiotics
Halogen-containing natural products
Nephrotoxins
Total synthesis
World Health Organization essential medicines
Wikipedia medicine articles ready to translate